The Blood Stays on the Blade, released on May 12, 2008 through Thirty Days of Night Records, is the second EP and third release from the St Albans-based hardcore punk band Your Demise. It is the follow-up to their debut full-length You Only Make Us Stronger.

Track listing

References

2008 EPs
Your Demise albums